Prince Christian Victor Albert Louis Ernst Anton of Schleswig-Holstein  (14 April 1867 – 29 October 1900) was a member of the British royal family. He was the eldest son of Princess Helena, third daughter of Queen Victoria.

Early life
Prince Christian was born on 14 April 1867, at Windsor Castle. His father was Prince Christian of Schleswig-Holstein, the third son of Christian, Duke of Augustenborg, and Countess Louise Sophie of Danneskiold-Samsøe. His mother was Princess Helena, the fifth child and third daughter of Queen Victoria of the United Kingdom and Prince Albert. His parents resided in the United Kingdom, at Cumberland Lodge, and the Prince was considered a member of the British royal family. Under letters patent of 1866, he was styled His Highness Prince Christian Victor of Schleswig-Holstein.

He was baptised in the private chapel at Windsor Castle. His godparents were Queen Victoria (his maternal grandmother), the Duke of Augustenburg (his paternal grandfather; represented by Prince Arthur), the Prince of Wales (his maternal uncle), the Crown Princess of Prussia (his maternal aunt; represented by Princess Louise), the Duke of Saxe-Coburg and Gotha (his maternal great-uncle; represented by the Duke of Edinburgh), and the Dowager Princess of Hohenlohe-Langenburg (his maternal half-great-aunt; represented by Lady Churchill).

Education
The Prince, who was educated at Lambrook, Wellington College, Magdalen College, Oxford, and the Royal Military College, Sandhurst, was commissioned into the King's Royal Rifle Corps (60th Rifles) in 1888, serving in the 4th Battalion King's Royal Rifle Corps.

"Christle", as the prince was known in the family, was the first member of the Royal Family to attend school instead of being educated by a tutor at home. That he studied at Wellington College made Queen Victoria very happy, as Prince Albert had helped to establish the institution many years before. At Wellington he played for the college First Eleven in 1883 and was captain of the cricket team in 1885. He was also captain of the cricket team while at Magdalen College and at Sandhurst, and made a single first-class appearance, for I Zingari against Gentlemen of England in 1887. He remains the only member of the British royal family to play cricket at such a high level.

Military career
Upon leaving Sandhurst in 1888, the Prince became a British Army officer in the King's Royal Rifle Corps. Posted to India, he participated in the Hazara and Miranzi expeditions in 1891 and the Isazi expedition in 1892. Moving to West Africa, in 1895 he participated in the Ashanti Expedition in the Gold Coast, now Ghana.

Upon his return, he was elevated to the rank of Major and then served under Lord Kitchener in 1898 when British and Egyptian troops defeated the Dervishes at Omdurman near Khartoum and recovered the Sudan.

The following year he served as a staff officer in the Second Boer War, being involved in the relief of Ladysmith under General Sir Redvers Buller and later was with Lord Roberts in Pretoria.

Cricket
The Prince was a keen amateur cricketer, and played a single first-class match for I Zingari in 1897. He scored 35 and 0. In lesser cricket, he represented Wellington College and also founded his own eponymous cricket team.

Death

In October 1900, while in Pretoria, he came down with malaria, and died of enteric fever, on 29 October, aged 33, after receiving Holy Communion in the presence of Lord Roberts and Prince Francis of Teck. He was interred in the Pretoria cemetery on 1 November 1900. His grave is marked with a granite cross and a cast-iron railing.

Writing in her journal, the Prince's grandmother Queen Victoria wrote of her grandson's death:

Legacy

There is a monument to him in the Chapel of the Crucifixion at Frogmore Mausoleum by Emil Fuchs. It was originally placed in St George's Chapel. Another monument dedicated to him also serves as a monument to the fallen officers, NCOs and Soldiers of the Devonshire, Somerset and Gloucestershire Regiments who lost their lives in the Boer War. This monument is located on Plymouth Hoe in Plymouth, outside the entrance to the Royal Citadel.

There is also a statue of the Prince outside Windsor Castle (Berkshire, England), erected by his friends. The accompanying plaque displays his orders and campaign medals.

Prince Christian's parents dedicated a window to him in the Royal Chapel of All Saints in Windsor Great Park in 1905.

T. Herbert Warren's biography of Prince Christian was published by John Murray in 1903.

Honours
 :
 GCB: Extra Knight Grand Cross of the Bath (civil division), 19 July 1890
 GCVO: Knight Grand Cross of the Royal Victorian Order, 8 December 1898
 DSO: Distinguished Service Order
 KStJ: Knight of Justice of St. John
 Queen Victoria Golden Jubilee Medal, with clasp for Diamond Jubilee 
 India General Service Medal (1854)
 Ashanti Star
 Queen's Sudan Medal
 Queen's South Africa Medal
  Kingdom of Prussia: Knight of the Red Eagle, 1st Class, 28 July 1891; 3rd Class with Swords, 22 December 1891
    Ernestine duchies: Grand Cross of the Saxe-Ernestine House Order
 : Grand Cross of the Ludwig Order, 1 January 1890
  Duchy of Anhalt: Grand Cross of Albert the Bear, 1891
 : Order of Osmanieh, 1st Class
  Khedivate of Egypt: Khedive's Sudan Medal

Ancestry

References

House of Augustenburg
1867 births
1900 deaths
Military personnel from Berkshire
People from Windsor, Berkshire
People from Old Windsor
King's Royal Rifle Corps officers
British Army personnel of the Mahdist War
British military personnel of the Fourth Anglo-Ashanti War
British Army personnel of the Second Boer War
British military personnel killed in the Second Boer War
Knights Grand Cross of the Order of the Bath
Knights Grand Cross of the Royal Victorian Order
Companions of the Distinguished Service Order
Knights Hospitaller
Knights of Justice of the Order of St John
Alumni of Magdalen College, Oxford
Graduates of the Royal Military College, Sandhurst
People educated at Wellington College, Berkshire
Deaths from typhoid fever
Princes of Schleswig-Holstein-Sonderburg-Augustenburg
Free Foresters cricketers
I Zingari cricketers
English cricketers